Gennadi Avramenko (born 27 May 1965) is a Ukrainian sport shooter. He competed at the Summer Olympics in 1988 and 1996. In 1988, he won the bronze medal in the men's 50 metre running target event, and in 1996, he tied for 15th place in the men's 10 metre running target event.

References

1965 births
Living people
Running target shooters
Ukrainian male sport shooters
Shooters at the 1988 Summer Olympics
Shooters at the 1996 Summer Olympics
Medalists at the 1988 Summer Olympics
Olympic shooters of the Soviet Union
Olympic shooters of Ukraine
Olympic bronze medalists for the Soviet Union
Olympic medalists in shooting